Cornelsen is a surname. Notable people with the surname include:

 Brad Cornelsen, American football coach and player
 Greg Cornelsen (born 1952), Australian rugby union footballer
 Jack Cornelsen (born 1994), Australian-born Japanese rugby union player